Netball America is a registered 501(c)(3) not-for-profit organization founded in 2007. Netball America is the leading authority on Netball in the United States," and its vision is to have every American child learn and play Netball through school or after-school programs.  Using Netball as a platform to empower youth for peace and strong futures, while helping to reduce childhood obesity, breaking down barriers to reduce discrimination and increasing social-emotional learning. Netball in the United States.

Netball America currently has teams in 33 states.

Events 
Netball America was sanctioned by the United States International University Sports Federation to host the second FISU World University Netball Championship in Miami 2016. Netball America also sent the first team of American citizens to the inaugural World University Netball Championship in South Africa in 2012 and to the 2016 Championships in Uganda.

Netball America also played host to the annual Disney International Youth Netball Tournament in Florida and the Golden Oldies 2013 World Netball Festival in San Diego as well as the upcoming 2020 Golden Oldies World Netball Festival in Hawaii.  The annual U.S. Open Netball Championships® is the largest Netball event in North America and has drawn over 100,000 viewers.  This event is held in November every year and is located in a different city each year.  The Junior U.S. Open Netball Championships® is held in April each year and also moves to a different city each year.

Partnerships 

Netball America's Let's Move the Youth Programs are designed to provide disadvantaged youth with opportunities to learn about health education, participate in fitness programs, and develop leadership skills while being part of a team.  The GoGirlGo! program is currently being rolled out across the USA.  Netball America also has partnered with The President's Challenge Program and have incorporated the President's Active Lifestyle Award and the 'I Can Do It You Can Do It' programs.  The participants receive a certificate signed by the President. The President's Challenge program supported former First Lady Michelle Obama's Let's Move! initiative to end childhood obesity within a generation.

Netball America is a partner with the Bermuda Netball Association to implement leading-edge coaching and umpiring techniques, including world-class accreditation, in Bermuda.

The team's vice captain spoke at the Oprah Winfrey Leadership Academy for Girls in South Africa about how netball and sports helped her during her recovery from a ski accident, after being told she could never play contact sports again. Netball America's president spoke to the school kids, teachers and local community leaders about physical activity and nutrition, academic success, and the benefits of sports.

See also 
 Netball in the Americas

References

Netball in the United States
America
Sports governing bodies in the United States
2007 establishments in the United States